Cyrestis acilia  is a butterfly in the family Nymphalidae. It is found in Sulawesi (Endemic Sulawesi mainland,  Buton island, Kabaena island and Wowoni island).

Subspecies
Cyrestis acilia acilia
Cyrestis acilia abisa Fruhstorfer, 1904 (Obi)
Cyrestis acilia aruana Martin, 1903 (Aru)
Cyrestis acilia bettina Fruhstorfer, 1899 (Sula Islands)
Cyrestis acilia biaka Grose-Smith, 1894 (Biak)
Cyrestis acilia ceramensis Martin, 1903 (Ambon, Serang)
Cyrestis acilia dola Fruhstorfer, 1904 (Fergusson Island, Kiriwina)
Cyrestis acilia eximia Oberthür, 1879 (Sanghie Islands)
Cyrestis acilia fratercula Salvin & Godman, 1877 (New Britain, Duke of York, New Ireland, New Hanover)
Cyrestis acilia haterti Martin, 1903 (Halmahera)
Cyrestis acilia jordani Martin, 1903 (Morotai)
Cyrestis acilia kumambana van Mastrigt, 2010 (Papua New Guinea)
Cyrestis acilia laelia (C. & R. Felder, 1860) (Batchian)
Cyrestis acilia latifascia Martin, 1903 (Ternate)
Cyrestis acilia maforensis Martin, 1903 (Mafor Island)
Cyrestis acilia misolensis Martin, 1903 (Misol)
Cyrestis acilia moorensis van Mastrigt, 2010 (Papua New Guinea)
Cyrestis acilia nitida Mathew, 1887 (Solomon Islands)
Cyrestis acilia parthenia Röber, 1887 (Banggai)
Cyrestis acilia russellensis Tennent, 2001 (Solomon Islands)
Cyrestis acilia sicca Fruhstorfer, 1904 (Buru)
Cyrestis acilia solomonis Mathew, 1887 (Solomon Islands)
Cyrestis acilia strigata C. & R. Felder, 1862 (Sulawesi, Togian, Kabaena, Wowoni, Butung)
Cyrestis acilia ulawana Martin, 1903 (Ulawa Island)

References

  21 Oktober 2017
 fobi 23 September 2013
 ADW 23 September 2013
 Butterflies of Southeastern Sulawesi 23 September 2013
 flickr 23 September 2013

Butterflies described in 1819
Elymniini
Butterflies of Indonesia
Taxa named by Jean-Baptiste Godart